Cystopeltidae is a family of air-breathing land slugs, terrestrial pulmonate gastropod mollusks in the superfamily Punctoidea (according to the taxonomy of the Gastropoda by Bouchet & Rocroi, 2005).

Genera and species 
The family Cystopeltidae has no subfamilies. Genera and species within the family Cystopeltidae include: 
 Cystopelta
 Cystopelta astra
 Cystopelta bicolor
 Cystopelta petterdi
 Cystopelta purpurea

References

 Discover Life info